This is a list of gliders/sailplanes of the world, (this reference lists all gliders with references, where available) 
Note: Any aircraft can glide for a short time, but gliders are designed to glide for longer.

Russian/USSR miscellaneous constructors 
 Anoschenko ND Macaque
 Anotchenko Makaka – N.D. Anotchenko
 Aviatrust Moskau
 Aviatrust Rote Presnia
 Berkout
 Borchn-Anemon BA-1 Tandem – Борчн- Анмонов БА-1
 Charkov ChAI-3 Харьков ХАИ-3
 Cochkanoff man-powered aircraft
 Delone 1909 glider – Делоне 1909
 Dobahov Krymosoaviahim
 Dobrovolski 1911 – S. P. Dobrovloski
 Domrachev Leningrad – Домрачева Ленинград – Y. V. Domrachev
 DOSAAF Aktivista
 Eliferov Aviafak 1 – Елиферов Авиафак 1
 Gremyatsky Diskoplan – Anatoli Grematsky
 Groshev G-2 – G. Groshev
 Groshev GN-7
 Ilyushin Il-32 – OKB Ilyushin
 Ilyushin Mastyazhart – S.V. Ilyushin
 Kalinin K-11 – proof of concept glider for K-12 / BS-2 / K-13 tailless airliner / bomber.
 Klementyev APS-11  P. Klementyev
 Kostenko-Rauschenbusch LAK-1 – Костенко-Раушенбах ЛАК-1
 Kostenko-Rauschenbusch LAK-2 – Костенко-Раушенбах ЛАК-2
 Kovalenko DR-5
 Lush Swift Vladimir S. Lush
 Lyushin Maori – S. N. Lyushin
 Manotskov Kachouk – A. Manotskov (variable dihedral) – (Маноцкова Кашук)
 Nikitin PSN-1 – Vasilii Vasilyevich Nikitin – Glider bomb
 Nikitin PSN-2 – Vasilii Vasilyevich Nikitin – Glider bomb
 Oskbes Aviatika Mai 920 – Oskbes MAI Moskau Aviation Institut
 Petsuha PAI-6 – (Пьецуха ПАИ-6) – A. I. Petsuha
 Polikarpov BJP – Nikolaj Polikarpov– AMI
 Pychnov Strij – V. S. Pyshnov – AVF – (Aviarabotnik)
 Rostov GT-1 Kaganovich – Rostov Technical Institute
 Sharapov AN Brawler Kudeyar  "Desperado"
 Skif (glider)
 Smolenets – (Смоленец)
 Spartakus 1 – E. Kristovskogo
 Spivak Kolesnikov Vega-1 – D. N. Kolesnikov & Spivak
 Spivak Kolesnikov Vega-2
 Tański Lotnia 2 – TAŃSKI, Czesław Tański
 Tikhonravov AVF-1 Aral – (Тихонравова АВФ-1 Арап) – M. K. Tikhonravov – Aviarabotnik
 Tolstoï Korchoun – . L. & Tolstoï, G. P. & K. Zeyvang – aka Толстых Коршун (Tolstoï Cerf-volant)
 Tupolev TB-6 glider (ANT-33?)
 Vakhmistrov-Tikhonravov Dragon V. Vakhmistrov & M. Tikhonravov
 Valk IOS – S.F. Valk
 Valk IOS-2
 Vekchine 1910 glider – G. D. Vekchine
 Yeremeyev Stalinets-4 P. Yeremeyev
 Za Mir

Notes

Further reading

External links

Lists of glider aircraft